The Interlachen Hall is a historic site in Interlachen, Florida, located at 215 Atlantic Avenue, on the southwest corner of Commonwealth Avenue. It has functioned as a meeting center for the town since its completion in 1892. On June 2, 2000, it was added to the U.S. National Register of Historic Places.

References

External links
 Interlachen Historical Trail at Historic Hiking Trails

National Register of Historic Places in Putnam County, Florida
Vernacular architecture in Florida